This is a list of Iranian composers. See also full list of Iranian musicians and singers.

Classical/Traditional Persian composers
Abolhasan Saba
Ali-Naqi Vaziri
Ali Tajvidi
Ardavan Kamkar
Ardeshir Kamkar
Faramarz Payvar
Hamid Motebassem
Homayoun Khorram
Hossein Alizadeh
Hossein Dehlavi
Jalal Zolfonoun
Mahmoud Zoufonoun
Mohammad-Reza Darvishi
Mohammad Reza Lotfi
Mohammad Reza Shajarian
Mahyar Alizadeh
Mojtaba Mirzadeh
Mehdi Rajabian
Nima Aziminejad
Parviz Meshkatian
Saeed Farajpouri

Contemporary Persian composers
Aftab Darvishi
Aida Shirazi
Ali Radman
Arshia Samsaminia
Ahmad Pejman
Ali Rahbari
Ali Ahmadifar
Alireza Mashayekhi
Alireza Motevaseli
Amin Honarmand
Anahita Abbasi
Ardavan Kamkar
Bahar Royaee
Behzad Abdi
Behzad Mirkhani
Behzad Ranjbaran
Faramarz Payvar
Fariborz Lachini
Fouzieh Majd
Golfam Khayam
Golnoush Khaleghi
Heshmat Sanjari
Hooshyar Khayam
Hormoz Farhat
Hossein Alizâdeh
Houshang Ostovar
Idin Samimi Mofakham
Kiawasch Sahebnassagh
Majid Entezami
Mohammad-Reza Darvishi
Mohammad Reza Tafazzoli
Mehdi Hosseini
Mehdi Rajabian
Mohammad Shams
Morteza Hannaneh
Nader Mashayekhi
Negar Bouban
Negin Zomorodi
Niloufar Nourbakhsh
Nima A Rowshan
Nina Barzegar
Reza Najfar
Reza Vali
Sahba Aminikia
Saman Samadi
Sara Abazari
Shahab Paranj
Shahin Farhat
Showan Tavakol
Varoujan Hakhbandian

Western Classical
 Aftab Darvishi
 Aida Shirazi
 Ali Radman
 Ali Rahbari
 Alireza Motevaseli
 Amin Honarmand
 Aminollah Hossein
 Anahita Abbasi
 Anoushiravan Rohani
 Arshia Samsaminia
 Ali Shahbazi
 Bahar Royaee
 Behzad Ranjbaran
 Fouzieh Majd
 Golfam Khayam 
 Hangi Tavakoli 
 Heshmat Sanjari
 Hooshyar Khayam
 Hormoz Farhat
 Houshang Ostovar
 Idin Samimi Mofakham
 Kiawasch Sahebnassagh
 Loris Tjeknavorian
 Nader Mashayekhi
 Negar Bouban
 Negin Zomorodi
 Niloufar Nourbakhsh
 Nima A Rowshan
 Nina Barzegar
 Mahdyar Aghajani
 Mehdi Hosseini
 Reza Najfar
 Shahrdad Rohani
 Saman Samadi
 Samin Baghcheban
 Sara Abazari
 Shahin Farhat
 Showan Tavakol
 Tara Kamangar

Musical theatre 

 Mehdi Rajabian
 Ramin Karimloo

Composers
Iranian